The US Embassy in Yaoundé is diplomatic mission of the United States to Cameroon.

Leadership

Ambassador is in charge of the Embassy. Mary E. Daschbach is current Chargé d’Affaires. Joe Biden has nominated Christopher Lamora as the next Ambassador of the United States to Cameroon.

History
The United States established the embassy in 1960.

See also

List of diplomatic missions of the United States
Cameroon–United States relations

References

Official website

 Official website

Diplomatic missions of the United States
United States
Cameroon–United States relations